Wendy Colonna is an American singer-songwriter originally from Lake Charles, Louisiana. Her albums include Red (2003), Right Where I Belong (2005), Old New Borrowed & Blue (2007), and We Are One (2010).

Colonna's music has been featured as part of Austin's airport's ''Music in the Air' program.

References

External links
Wendy Colonna Official website

Living people
American women singer-songwriters
Year of birth missing (living people)
21st-century American women